Tipula lateralis is a species of true craneflies.

Distribution
Widespread throughout the Palaearctic. Flies from March to September.

Identification
See

References

 

Tipulidae
Diptera of Europe
Diptera of Asia
Insects described in 1830